Mohamed Fayad (born 10 July 1967) is a Syrian weightlifter. He competed in the men's middle heavyweight event at the 1988 Summer Olympics.

References

1967 births
Living people
Syrian male weightlifters
Olympic weightlifters of Syria
Weightlifters at the 1988 Summer Olympics
Place of birth missing (living people)